Ruba Ghazal (born December 6, 1977) is a Canadian politician, who was elected to the National Assembly of Quebec in the 2018 provincial election. She represents the electoral district of Mercier as a member of Québec solidaire.

Early life and education 
Ghazal was born in Beirut, Lebanon to a family of Palestinian refugees. She lived in the United Arab Emirates until she was 10, when her family immigrated to Quebec. She studied at HEC Montréal.

Political career 
Ghazal was a founding member of Québec solidaire in 2006, and was the party's candidate for Laurier-Dorion in the 2007 and 2008 general elections. In 2018, she was elected to the National Assembly of Quebec for Mercier, succeeding Amir Khadir.

Political views

Language issues 
Ghazal has pushed for government policies to reverse the decline of the French language in Montreal. As Québec solidaire's critic for language issues, Ghazal has advocated for the creation of a special branch of the Office québécois de la langue française (OQLF) for Montreal.

Foreign policy 
In 2021, Ghazal attended protests amid the 2021 Israel–Palestine crisis against the Israeli government's actions in actions in Sheikh Jarrah. Ghazal stated that "One day we will look back and declare this a humanitarian crime against Palestinians." Ghazal was among the signatories of a 2021 letter opposing Canada's bid for a seat on the United Nations Security Council due to the country's position on Palestine.

References

Living people
1977 births
People from Beirut
Lebanese people of Palestinian descent
Canadian people of Palestinian descent
Lebanese emigrants to Canada
Politicians from Montreal
Québec solidaire MNAs
Women MNAs in Quebec
21st-century Canadian politicians
Canadian politicians of Lebanese descent
21st-century Canadian women politicians
Canadian accountants
HEC Montréal alumni

Arab Canadian